Rod Taylor (born 2 March 1957, in Kingston, Jamaica), also known as Rocky T, is a reggae singer and producer.

Biography
After forming a short-lived group called The Aliens with Barry Brown and Johnny Lee, Taylor recorded his first single, "Bad Man Comes and Goes" in 1975 for Ossie Hibbert. He gained exposure as part of Bertram Brown's Freedom Sounds collective (along with other reggae artists such as Prince Alla and Earl Zero), releasing the hit single "Ethiopian Kings", which led to work with Mikey Dread. He subsequently worked with a variety of producers in the late 1970s and early 1980s including Prince Far I, Ossie Hibbert, Prince Hammer, and Nigger Kojak.

Taylor's debut album, If Jah Should Come Now, was issued in 1979, with Where Is Your Love Mankind following in 1980.  After a few quiet years, Taylor re-emerged in the late 1980s with the One In a Million album, with further releases following into the 2000s.
Rod Taylor is still performing with sound systems or bands, especially with the French Band Positive Roots Band.

Albums
If Jah Should Come Now (1980) Belva Sounds/Daddy Kool/Little Luke
Where Is Your Love Mankind (1980) Greensleeves
One In a Million (1989) Sonic Sounds
Lonely Girl (1990) King Culture
Liberate (1993) Word Sound & Power
Tell Dem (1999) Word Sound & Power
Ethiopian Kings (1999) Patate
Blackman History (2000) Mellow Sound
Shining Bright (2002) Jah Warrior
Trust In Jah (2003) Cousins
The Prophet Rise Again Corner Stone
Garden of Eden (2007) Belleville
Hold On Strong (2009) Nagona Music Records
Stop & Look (2009) Sip A Cup

References

External links
Rod Taylor at Roots Archives

Rod Taylor discography at Rootsdub

1957 births
Jamaican reggae musicians
Jamaican record producers
Living people
Musicians from Kingston, Jamaica
Greensleeves Records artists